The Whitest Kids U' Know (WKUK) is an American sketch comedy show starring a comedy troupe of the same name. The group consisted of Trevor Moore, Zach Cregger, Sam Brown, Timmy Williams and Darren Trumeter, though other actors occasionally appeared in their sketches. They were accepted into the HBO U.S. Comedy Arts Festival in 2006 and won the award for Best Sketch Group.

Formation

The Whitest Kids began in 1999 when Trevor Moore, a young comedian from Charlottesville, Virginia, transferred to New York's School of Visual Arts film program. Moore previously produced a local TV sketch-comedy show in Virginia titled The Trevor Moore Show, which was picked up by PAX Network.

After making the rounds at local New York City comedy clubs, he eventually met fellow SVA film student Sam Brown from Massachusetts and SVA Graphic Design student/actor Zach Cregger, from Arlington, Virginia. By chance, all three lived in the same dormitory. According to an IFC interview, Trevor Moore said the group's name originated during a freestyle rapping session on a subway when one of their friends said, "You guys are the whitest kids I know".

The troupe started off as an officially sanctioned club at School of Visual Arts. During the early years, WKUK included Jon Kovel, Oliver Lyons, Jordan Cooper, Anthony Mair, and singer Tina Tiongson. Timmy Williams also joined in late 2001 and was the only member at the time who did not attend SVA.

The Whitest Kids U' Know held near-monthly free shows at SVA's amphitheater, which would frequently fill to capacity. Finally, in 2003, as Moore approached graduation, the group separated officially from the school, and all but Moore, Brown, Cregger and Williams left the troupe. Darren Trumeter, an actor and filmmaker who had worked previously with Cregger, was then added that same year.

Starting in 2003, the reinvented troupe started touring the various comedy venues in New York City, concluding in early 2005 with a well-attended show at Caroline's, a famous stand-up comedy club in Times Square.

Television
In 2005, the group began working with noted comedy producer Jim Biederman. In early 2006, Biederman and the Whitest Kids sold the show to the Fuse network after the Whitest Kids won the Best Sketch Group award at the Aspen Comedy Festival. Production of the first season took place in New York City, during the summer of 2006. The first season of The Whitest Kids U' Know premiered in March 2007. It was an instant hit for Fuse, and the show was immediately picked up for a second season.

However, due to what Fuse perceived as extreme comedy, the second season order came with limitations on content. The group considered walking away from the pick up order over the new content restrictions. Then, however, head of Fuse programming Jennifer Caserta left to become the General Manager of the IFC network and brought the Whitest Kids along with her to IFC. At the time, Fuse and IFC were both part of Rainbow Media. The Rainbow Media executives felt that the Whitest Kids program was more appropriate for IFC than Fuse, so they approved the switch.

On July 12, 2007, Trevor Moore posted a message on the Whitest Kids U' Know's official website stating that the second season of the Whitest Kids' TV show would move to the Independent Film Channel (IFC). According to Moore, they were excited about the channel switch because it allowed for no commercial breaks, with vulgarities and obscene content uncensored. However, IFC began airing commercials during their programming on December 8, 2010, and the show was censored at certain times of day (including removing stronger sexual language such as "fuck" and censoring any nudity), despite promises that it would remain unedited.

Shooting for season two of the show started on August 13, 2007, and debuted on IFC on February 10, 2008.

The season one DVD was released on February 5, 2008. It was stated several times on the show that the season was going to be first released uncensored on DVD. However, IFC started to air uncensored episodes of season one just two months before the DVD release.

The tenth episode of season two was broadcast live on IFC. The sketches performed on stage were based on their stage shows. Trevor Moore stated the live episode was a response to the season being one episode short.

The third season, which premiered on IFC on January 27, 2009, in the 10 pm time slot, was composed of ten 30-minute episodes as well as twenty 15-minute episodes. Both formats played on IFC.

The fourth season premiered on June 11, 2010, on IFC, continuing with the ten 30-minute and twenty 15-minute episode formats.

The fifth season premiered on April 15, 2011, and was the final season of the show. The format of 10 half-hour episodes remains, with each episode ending with a segment of The Civil War on Drugs, a full-length film starring Whitest Kids troupe members reimagining the American Civil War as a war on drugs. Moore revealed that the film will be released on Amazon in feature-length with a commentary by him and the rest of the troupe.

Return
On May 6, 2020, Trevor Moore started a short-lived internet series during the COVID-19 pandemic titled "Trevor Moore's Quarantine Show" uploaded to a newly created YouTube channel called OfficialWKUK. Moore, Brown, Cregger, Trumeter, and Williams later started uploading more frequently to the channel featuring HD quality video of their sketches from their show. They also would occasionally upload a Dungeons and Dragons campaign entitled "Buckerson and Meyers" where they humorously attempt to complete the campaign laid out by Williams.

On September 5, 2020, the group started video streaming on Twitch with weekly scheduled shows with no permanent timeslots:

 Collective Souls –Cregger plays 2016 video game Dark Souls III, where he attempts to achieve a "No Death Run" and occasionally takes a fan or other members of the comedy troupe calls, during play. Typically he streams Monday, Wednesday, or Friday. On December 29, 2020, Cregger successfully achieved a no death run of Demon's Souls.
 Timmy Plays Animal Crossing –Williams plays the 2020 video game Animal Crossing: New Horizons, usually streaming on Monday.
 Sam's Show For Depressed Losers –Brown hosts the show with no particular topic or plan in mind, occasionally streaming with Trumeter or viewers that call-in through Discord. Brown streams on Wednesdays.
 Sexy Socks –Originally "Sexy Stocks", Trumeter and Brown discuss the stock market and converse with the Twitch chat room. They have the most inconsistent timeslot, streaming off and on Wednesday.
 Zucchini Boyz –Williams cooks from recipes, live, usually taking requests from the Twitch chat room. He typically streams on Thursdays.
 Newsboyz –"The flagship show" according to co-host Trevor Moore. The show consists of Moore and co-host Zach Cregger reading news articles and discussing their week. Moore and Cregger spend the whole week without reading the news in an attempt to give more realistic takes while on the show. They refer to the show as "the best show on the network" much to the chagrin of the rest of the troupe. They have one of the most consistent time-slots streaming on Friday, 7 pm-9 pm PST.
 Self Suck Saturday –The most popular show on the Twitch channel, the stream consists of the entire troupe watching sketches from their IFC television show, conversation with chat, and viewing fan art. Along with Newsboyz, it has one of the most consistent time-slots, streaming on Saturday at 7 pm PST.

They have stated all the money they make from the YouTube and Twitch will go to the production of their new animated film Mars.

Following Moore's death on August 7, 2021, the remaining members have continued to stream occasionally.

Films
Moore and Cregger wrote, directed, and starred in the 2009 comedy film Miss March.

In 2012, Moore wrote on his website that a true Whitest Kids U' Know movie was planned, and that the script was being written.

On February 11, 2017, Moore announced via Instagram that the film's script had been completed.

On November 17, 2020, Cregger revealed the name of the film to be Mars and will be animated instead of live-action. Cregger also mentioned instead of being funded by a studio they preferred to raise the money themselves.

On February 16, 2021, The Civil War on Drugs was released in its entirety on Amazon.

On August 23, 2021, Cregger, speaking of Moore's passing and the film while livestreaming, stated "We are going to finish Mars! All of Trevor's lines are recorded, he has given notes on the animatic, everything that we need to get done is done. So, the Mars that is going to be completed is the Mars that — I want everyone to know — Trevor signed off on." In 2022, Cregger stated that the film has almost wrapped production, and that, as a result of Trevor's death, it would be the troupe's final project.

Album

The Whitest Kids U' Know is the debut album of the New York City–based sketch comedy troupe, released in 2006.

References

External links
 Official website
 
 Extensive audio interview on public radio program The Sound of Young America

2007 American television series debuts
2011 American television series endings
2000s American black comedy television series
2000s American sketch comedy television series
2010s American black comedy television series
2010s American sketch comedy television series
IFC (American TV channel) original programming
Fuse (TV channel) original programming
American comedy troupes
American parodists
American satirists
Television series by Entertainment One